Vaxis – Act I: The Unheavenly Creatures is the ninth studio album by progressive rock band Coheed and Cambria. It was released on October 5, 2018, returning to the band's Amory Wars concept after 2015's The Color Before the Sun.

Background and recording
Recorded between January and March 2018, The Unheavenly Creatures continues the band's Amory Wars concept, unlike their previous album The Color Before the Sun. On May 31, 2018 the band released the first two tracks of the album, "Prologue" and "The Dark Sentencer", on YouTube. The track listing and album artwork were released on June 22, 2018 after days of teasers depicting fragments of the art. The band released the song "Unheavenly Creatures", which is the album's third track, on June 28. On August 16, "The Gutter" was released and on September 27, "Old Flames" was released.

The music of The Unheavenly Creatures has been described by music critics as progressive rock and progressive metal, noting many songs spanning influences such as punk rock, pop rock, and indie rock.

Release
The album was released on October 5, 2018. A deluxe box-set version of the album includes a novella written by the band's vocalist and guitarist Claudio Sanchez and his wife Chondra Echert, with artwork by Chase Stone, a replica "Creature" mask from the "Unheavenly Creatures" music video custom designed by Claudio Sanchez, a Coheed and Cambria "Black Card" that allows fans early access to tickets along with free entry into Coheed and Cambria headline shows and was valid until December 19, 2019, a three fold poster containing the album artwork, as well as a certificate of authenticity signed by the four members of the band and a demo CD, The Crown Heights Demos. 

The song "Unheavenly Creatures" was released as downloadable content for the game Rock Band 4.

Reception

At Metacritic, which assigns a rating out of 100 to reviews from mainstream critics, Vaxis – Act I: The Unheavenly Creatures generated a score of 75/100 from seven reviews, indicating "generally favorable reviews".

Track listing

Personnel

Coheed and Cambria
Claudio Sanchez – lead vocals, rhythm guitar
Travis Stever – lead guitar, backing vocals
Josh Eppard – drums, percussion, keyboards, backing vocals
Zach Cooper – bass guitar, backing vocals

Additional musicians
 Karl Berger – string arrangements, vibraphone
 Jason Hwang – viola
 Ernesto Llorens – violin
 Sana Nagano – violin
 Jane Scarpantoni – cello

Artwork
Chase Stone

Charts

References

2018 albums
Coheed and Cambria albums
Roadrunner Records albums
Science fiction concept albums
The Amory Wars